Jakub Menšík (born 1 September 2005) is a Czech tennis player.

On the junior tour, Menšík has a career high ITF junior combined ranking of 3 achieved on 31 January 2022. He reached the final of the 2022 Australian Open boys' singles, losing to Bruno Kuzuhara after suffering from thigh muscle cramps.

Junior Grand Slam finals

Singles: 1 (1 runner-up)

ATP Challenger and ITF Futures finals

Singles: 4 (4–0)

Doubles 1 (1–0)

References

External links

2005 births
Living people
Czech male tennis players